Richardton-Taylor Public School District No. 34 is a school district headquartered in Richardton, North Dakota. It operates Taylor-Richardton Elementary School in Taylor and Richardton-Taylor High School in Richardton.

It is mostly in Stark County, where it serves Richardton and Taylor. A portion is in Dunn County.

History
The Richardton school building opened in 1961.

In April 2007 the school board chose Brent Bautz, previously of the Bisbee-Egeland School District, as the superintendent of Richardton-Taylor. In 2007 the elementary school had 120 students and the secondary school had 115 students.

In 2009 the district had 240 students, and the population had declined for some time. By 2013 the student population was up to 273. That year Lauren Donovan stated the building maintenance issues in the Richardton campus were "deep and severe".

In 2016 the school district had 300 students. In 2016 it began having a separate property for pre-Kindergarten through grade 1 on leased property at St. Mary's Social Center. There was a plan for a $15 million renovation of the secondary school in Richardton.

References

External links
 Richardton-Taylor High School
School districts in North Dakota
Dunn County, North Dakota
Education in Stark County, North Dakota